WATN may refer to:

 WATN (AM), a radio station (1240 AM) licensed to Watertown, New York, United States
 WATN-TV, a television station (channel 25/PSIP 24) licensed to Memphis, Tennessee, United States

See also
Where Are They Now? (disambiguation)